This is a list of electoral results for the electoral district of Ipswich West in Queensland state elections.

Members for Ipswich West

Election results

Elections in the 2020s

Elections in the 2010s

Elections in the 2000s

Elections in the 1990s

Elections in the 1980s

Elections in the 1970s

Elections in the 1960s

References

Queensland state electoral results by district